When You Come Home is a 1948 British comedy film directed by John Baxter and starring Frank Randle, Leslie Sarony and Leslie Holmes. It had a larger production budget than Randle's previous films, which had been made in Manchester.

Premise
When the music hall where he works is threatened with closure, a handyman organises an effort to save it.

Cast

References

Bibliography
 Murphy, Robert. Realism and Tinsel: Cinema and Society in Britain 1939-48. Routledge, 1992.

External links

1948 films
1948 comedy films
1940s English-language films
Films directed by John Baxter
British comedy films
British black-and-white films
Films scored by Percival Mackey
1940s British films